Club Deportivo Independiente Juniors, known as Independiente Juniors or formerly as Alianza Cotopaxi, is a football club based in Sangolquí, Ecuador. The club acts as Independiente del Valle's reserve team.

History
Founded on 13 July 2017 as Alianza Cotopaxi SC in Cotopaxi, the club reached the Segunda Categoría after finishing second in the regional championships. In the following year, the club reached an agreement with Independiente del Valle to become their reserve team, and reached promotion to the Ecuadorian Serie B at the end of the year, after having the core of the 2018 U-20 Copa Libertadores.

After the promotion to the second division of Ecuadorian football, the club changed name to Club Deportivo Independiente Juniors, and moved to Latacunga. In 2020, the club moved to Sangolquí, joining the first team which was already in the city.

List of managers
 Franklin Anangonó (2017)
 Juan Carlos León (2018–2019)
 Yuri Solano (2020)
 Felipe Sánchez (2021)
 Miguel Bravo (2022–)

References

External links

Official websites
Official site

2017 establishments in Ecuador
Association football clubs established in 2017
Football clubs in Ecuador
Juniors